Gravel Hole may refer to:

Gravel Hole, Shropshire
a former name for Thornham, Greater Manchester